The 2011 FIFA Beach Soccer World Cup is an international beach soccer tournament being held in Ravenna, Italy from 1 September until 11 September 2011. This page lists all of the players that have scored at least one goal during the tournament.

Goals scored during the penalty kick session after an extra time period do not count toward a player's individual goal total.

14 goals 
 André

12 goals 
 Madjer

9 goals 
 Francisco Velasquez

8 goals 
 Egor Shaykov

7 goals 

 Paolo Palmacci
 Egor Eremeev
 Ilya Leonov
 Dmitry Shishin

6 goals 

 Victor Tale
 Nuno Belchior
 Pape Koukpaki

5 goals 

 Sidney
 Aleksey Makarov
 Ndiaga Mbaye
 Agustin Ruiz

4 goals 

 Benjamin
 Bartholomew Ibenegbu
 Yuri Krasheninnikov
 Ngalla Sylla
 Dejan Stankovic

3 goals 

 Betinho
 Hassan Abdollahi
 Farid Boulokbashi
 Giuseppe Soria
 Morgan Plata
 Musa Najare
 Isiaka Olawale
 Jalal Al-Sinani
 Alan
 Lucio
 Yuri Gorchinskiy
 Mo Jaeggy
 Stephan Leu
 Teva Zaveroni

2 goals 

 Jonathan Levi
 Bruno Malias
 Buru
 Jorginho
 Mehdi Hassani
 Mohammad Mokhtari
 Francesco Corosiniti
 Franco Palma
 Masayuki Komaki
 Shusei Yamauchi
 Ricardo Villalobos
 Ogbonnaya Okemmiri
 James Okwuosa
 Rui Coimbra
 Anton Shkarin
 Ibrahima Bakhoum
 Libasse Diagne
 Babacar Fall
 Tomás Hernandez
 Oleg Zborovskyi
 Edgar Quintero

1 goal 

 Luciano Franceschini
 Sebastian Larreta
 German Spinelli
 Javier Vivas
 Anderson
 Mohammad Ahmadzadeh
 Moslem Mesigar
 Ali Naderi
 Simone Feudi
 Gabriele Gori
 Matteo Marrucci
 Franco Palma
 Hirofumi Oda
 Shunta Suzuki
 Antonio Barbosa
 Francisco Cati
 Jose Cervantes
 Angel Rodriguez
 Nelson Nwosu
 Hani Al-Dhabit
 Nasser Al-Mukhaini
 Ishaq Al-Mas
 Khalid Al-Rajhi
 Duarte
 Paulo Graça
 Bruno Novo
 Jordan Santos
 Bruno Torres
 Wilber Alvarado
 Jose Membreño
 Elias Ramirez
 Cheikh Ba
 Valentin Jaeggy
 Michael Rodrigues
 Angelo Schirinzi
 Sandro Spaccarotella
 Marama Amau
 Naea Bennett
 Tearii Labaste
 Igor Borsuk
 Sergiy Bozhenko
 Anton Butko
 Oleksandr Korniychuk
 Oleg Mozgovyy
 Roman Pachev
 Oleg Zborovskyi
 Kevin Camargo
 Gian Luca Cardone
 Francisco Landaeta
 Carlos Longa
 Marcos Monsalve

Own goal 

2 own goals

 Ngalla Sylla (playing against Switzerland)

1 own goal

 Betinho (playing against Russia)
 Nelson Nwosu (playing against Venezuela)
 Yahya Al Araimi (playing against Portugal)
 Nasser Al Mukhaini (playing against El Salvador)

References

Goal Scorers